The Office Central pour la Répression du Trafic Illicite des Stupéfiants is a cross agency and cross business department of the Judicial police. It is part of the sous-direction de la lutte contre la criminalité organisée et la délinquance financière. It was formed on 3 August 1953 in response to the 1936 treaty signed by the League of Nations.

Organisation
It comprises police, gendarmes and customs officers. Its headquarters are in the Nanterre district of Paris and it has detachments in:
Charles de Gaulle Airport
French Caribbean
Lille
Marseille
Bordeaux/Bayonne

Mission
Coordinate intelligence gathering to support investigations, prevention of drug trafficking
Carry out investigations nationwide to identify and dismantle drug trafficking operations
Provide technical support and expertise to local agencies
Coordinate operations with Foreign Ministry, Defense ministry and Customs
Provide drug related statistics to other Police departments
Represent the French police in international bodies and liaise with Interpol and Europol.

Resources
The office has access to the network of liaison officers of the Direction de la coopération internationale in drug producing countries and transit countries. The office also provides statistics and operational information through its OSIRIS system.

Officers participate in international agencies such as Maritime Analysis and Operations Centre, Centre de Coordination de la Lutte Anti-drogue en Méditerranée and regional intelligence exchange platforms in Africa.

See also
Maritime Analysis and Operations Centre
Joint Interagency Task Force

References

Specialist law enforcement agencies of France
National Police (France)